The 1910 Nevada gubernatorial election was held on November 8, 1910. Republican nominee Tasker Oddie defeated Democratic incumbent Denver S. Dickerson with 50.59% of the vote.

Primary elections
Primary elections were held on September 6, 1910.

Democratic primary

Candidates
Denver S. Dickerson, incumbent Governor
Frank R. Nicholas

Results

Republican primary

Candidates
Tasker Oddie, former State Senator
William A. Massey, former State Assemblyman

Results

General election

Candidates
Major party candidates
Tasker Oddie, Republican 
Denver S. Dickerson, Democratic

Other candidates
Henry F. Gegax, Socialist

Results

References

1910
Nevada
Gubernatorial